Paul Thomsen Kirk a.k.a. Akatombo is a Scottish-born Hiroshima-based electronic musician.  Kirk has worked with Graham Lewis of the band Wire.

Kirk has made short films to try an capture a visual representation of what "Akatombo" is. One such film, Unconfirmed Reports, was entered in the 2007 Wisconsin Film Festival.

Discography
Solo
Trace Elements (Spigel's Swim, 2003)
False Positives 
Sometime, Never (Hand-Held Recordings, 2015)
Short Fuse (Hand-Held Recordings, 2017)

With Graham Lewis
All Over (2014)

References

Scottish rock guitarists
Scottish keyboardists
Electronic musicians
Living people
Year of birth missing (living people)